United High School is a public high school near Hanoverton, Ohio, United States. It is the only secondary school in the United Local School District. Athletic teams compete as the United Golden Eagles in the Ohio High School Athletic Association as a member of the Eastern Ohio Athletic Conference.

History

District formation

On July 19, 1944, the then Hanover Rural School District held a special meeting for the purpose of consolidating with two other districts formerly known as the Kensington Special School District and the Butler School District. Between the three districts, eleven one-room school houses united under one roof as the United Local School. Specifically, the first phase of this new building was the elementary building, constructed with fifteen classrooms in 1951. As the number of students grew and advanced through the grades, classes were added and the high school was completed in 1955.

Recent additions
Today, the original high school classrooms house seventh and eighth grade students. Additional classes and renovations came about in subsequent years, with the next major additions to take place in 1966. Eight years later, an elementary gymnasium was added (Brautigam Center). The elementary expanded with additional classrooms in 1984. The high school had a number of major additions in 1993 when the Brautigam Center was also renovated to accommodate kindergarten classrooms. A new auditorium and gymnasium were added in 1997, along with a third level of classrooms in the high school. In 2001, a new football stadium with a surrounding rubberized track was constructed. The newest addition, in 2004, added a wing that added six rooms to the east wing of the elementary and relocated the elementary office to the front of the building, with a parent drop-off driveway.

Academics
According to the National Center for Education Statistics, in 2019, the school reported an enrollment of 536 pupils in grades 7th through 12th, with 208 pupils eligible for a federal free or reduced-price lunch. The school employed 39.50 teachers, yielding a student–teacher ratio of 13.57.

United High School offers courses in the traditional American curriculum.

Entering their third and fourth years, students can elect to attend the Columbiana County Career and Technical Center in Lisbon as either a part time student, taking core courses at United, while taking career or technical education at the career center, or as a full time student instead. Students may choose to take training in automotives, construction technology, cosmetology, culinary arts, health sciences, information technology, multimedia, landscape & environmental design, precision machining, veterinary science, and welding.

A student must earn 28 credits to graduate, including: 4 credits in a mathematics sequence, 3 credits in science, including life and physical science, 4 credits in English, 3 credits in a social studies sequence, 1 credit in fine art, 1 credit in health and physical education, 1 credit in personal finance, and 4.5 elective credits. Elective courses can be in English, science, social studies, foreign language, technology and business, family and consumer science, and fine art. Students attending the career center follow the same basic requirements, but have requirements in career & technical education rather than fine arts. All students must pass Ohio state exams in English I & II, Algebra I, Geometry, Biology, American History, and American Government, or the like.

References

External links
 District website

High schools in Columbiana County, Ohio
Public high schools in Ohio